The National Headquarters of the Israel Police (Binian HaMateh HeArtzi shel Mishteret Yisrael; short: HaMateh HeArtzi, "National Headquarters") is the headquarters of the Israel Police, located in Kiryat Menachem Begin in East Jerusalem.

History
During Israel's first two decades, the Israel Police headquarters were in Tel Aviv. As the organization increased its size, the need for a new staff building became apparent. Following the Six-Day War, in which Israel captured all of Jerusalem, a new location was chosen in eastern Jerusalem, between Mount Scopus and the western part of the city. 

The original building, first planned during the Jordanian period as a hospital, was redesigned by architect Dan Eytan and inaugurated in 1973, at which time a second and larger building was added. The Ministry of Public Security building was later built next to the police headquarters.

The Israel National Police headquarters houses a centralized computer in which all criminal records are stored. Gun permits, vehicle registration and driving licenses are also on file.

References

Israel Police
Buildings and structures in Jerusalem
Police headquarters
Headquarters in Israel